The African Unity Stadium ,  is a multi-use stadium in Mascara, Algeria. The Stade de l’Unité africaine is currently used mostly for football matches and is the home ground of GC Mascara. The stadium holds 22,000 people.

Algeria national football team matches

The African Unity Stadium has hosted two games of the Algeria national football team, against Ivory Coast in 1986 and USSR in 1987.

External links 
 Stade de l'Unité Africaine - elmoudjahid.com

References

Football venues in Algeria
Buildings and structures in Mascara Province